Thomas "Sailor Tom" Sharkey (November 26, 1873 – April 17, 1953) was a boxer who fought two fights with heavyweight champion James J. Jeffries. Sharkey's recorded ring career spanned from 1893 to 1904.  He is credited with having won 40 fights (with 37 KOs), 7 losses, and 5 draws. Sharkey was named to the Ring Magazines list of 100 greatest punchers of all time.

Early life
Sharkey was born in Dundalk, Ireland. His story began when he ran away from home and went to sea as a cabin boy. In 1892, Sharkey landed in New York City and joined the United States Navy. He was eventually deployed to Hawaii where he began his pro fighting career.

Career
Sharkey was easy to hit, but rough and tumble and a hard puncher. He had unusually broad shoulders for a man of his height, and sported a tattoo of a star and battleship on his chest. In 1900 he also acquired a large cauliflower ear, courtesy of a brawl with Gus Ruhlin, that added to his persona.

Sharkey's first bout against a front-line fighter occurred in 1896 when he fought Joe Choynski, who was later to knock out legendary heavyweight Jack Johnson, in an eight-round match.  Sharkey followed that fight up by challenging "Gentleman Jim" Corbett.  The two met and the fight was ruled a draw after four rounds due to police interference.

Sharkey vs. Fitzsimmons

On December 2, 1896, the San Francisco Athletic Club sponsored a fight at the Mechanics' Pavilion in San Francisco between Bob Fitzsimmons and Sharkey. Unable to find a referee, at the last minute they called on former lawman Wyatt Earp. He had officiated 30 or so matches in earlier days, though not under the Marquess of Queensbury rules. The fight may have been the most anticipated fight on American soil that year. It had been billed for the heavyweight championship of the world, as it was thought that the champion, James J. Corbett had relinquished the crown.

Fitzsimmons was favored to win, and bets flowed heavily his way. Earp entered the ring still armed with his customary Colt .45 and drew a lot of attention when he had to be disarmed. He later said he forgot he was wearing it. Fitzsimmons was taller and quicker than Sharkey and dominated the fight from the opening bell. In the eighth round, Fitzsimmons hit Sharkey with his famed "solar plexus punch," an uppercut under the heart that could render a man temporarily helpless. The punch caught Sharkey, Earp, and most of the crowd by surprise, and Sharkey dropped, clutched his groin, and rolled on the canvas, screamed foul.

Earp stopped the bout, ruling that Fitzsimmons had hit Sharkey when he was down. His ruling was greeted with loud boos and catcalls.  Earp based his decision on the Marquess of Queensbury rules, which state in part, "A man on one knee is considered down and if struck is entitled to the stakes." Very few witnessed the foul Earp ruled on. He awarded the decision to Sharkey, whom attendants carried out as "...limp as a rag.".

Sharkey vs. Jeffries

Sharkey claimed the heavyweight title until Corbett resumed his fighting career, who was recognized as the champion until he was knocked out by Fitzsimmons in a title bout. Sharkey was involved in another controversial fight when he faced Corbett on November 22, 1898. In this bout Sharkey manhandled the shifty and elusive Corbett. He threw him to the ground, hit him with hard punches to the body and head and seemed on the verge of imminent victory when one of Corbett's seconds jumped into the ring in the ninth round. The referee disqualified Corbett and awarded the bout to Sharkey.

On January 10, 1899, Sharkey faced another ring legend, the tricky Kid McCoy. Sharkey knocked out McCoy in the tenth round thereby securing a shot at the heavyweight title then held by James J. Jeffries. The two had met previously, fighting a hotly contested 20-round slugfest on May 6, 1898. The decision went to Jeffries in a close fight. Nevertheless, Sharkey vowed to beat the 6'2½ burly Jeffries in the rematch.

The two fought a memorable twenty-five round bout on November 3, 1899, in Coney Island, New York.  The match was the first championship fight filmed for motion pictures, and was first indoor fight successfully filmed. The lights required for the filming were so hot that they burned the hair from the top of both fighters' heads.

Sharkey took the early lead when he battered the larger Jeffries, but Jeffries gained control of the fight in the later rounds and the bout was awarded to him. During this fight, Sharkey suffered a broken nose and two broken ribs, and his left ear swelled to the size of a grapefruit.

Later life 
In 1938 he entered Laguna Honda Hospital in San Francisco, according to newspaper accounts, desperately ill. He died there in 1953 and is buried at Golden Gate National Cemetery in San Bruno, California.

Professional boxing record
All information in this section is derived from BoxRec, unless otherwise stated.

Official record

All newspaper decisions are officially regarded as “no decision” bouts and are not counted in the win/loss/draw column.

Unofficial record

Record with the inclusion of newspaper decisions in the win/loss/draw column.

References

External links

Bare-knuckle boxers
Heavyweight boxers
1873 births
1953 deaths